Cansei de Ser Sexy is the first full-length album by Brazilian indie rock band CSS. It was released on October 9, 2005 by Trama in Brazil, where it reportedly sold 5,000 copies and failed to chart. It was released in the United States on July 11, 2006 on the Sub Pop label, and in the United Kingdom on January 22, 2007 by Sire Records. A limited edition version of the album included a CD-R. The purpose of this was that the buyer could burn a copy of the album onto the CD-R to give to someone else as a gift, paying homage to the effects of digital technology upon the dissemination and popularization of music.

The song "Alala" and video for "Let's Make Love and Listen to Death from Above" were included preloaded on the Zune multimedia player, released in November 2006. The songs "Alala" and "Off the Hook" are featured in the Xbox 360 video games Forza Motorsport 2 and FIFA 08. The song "Music Is My Hot Hot Sex" was featured in a Zune advertisement in 2006 and an iPod Touch advertisement in 2007. The song "Alala" was featured in an episode of the MTV show The Hard Times of RJ Berger.

Reception

The album received mainly positive reviews—it was featured on Uncuts list of the 50 best records of 2006 at number eighteen, NMEs list of the 50 best records of 2006 at number five and Qs list of the 100 best records of 2006 at number eighty-nine. The album won the 2007 PLUG Independent Music Award for Best Punk Album.

Track listing

International version
The international version excluded five tracks from the Brazilian version (two of which appeared as bonus tracks on the US iTunes edition of the album), while including two tracks from the Brazilian-released EP CSS Suxxx.

Personnel
Credits for the international version of Cansei de Ser Sexy.

CSS
 Adriano Cintra – drums (1–4, 6–9, 11); guitar (2, 5, 6, 10, 11); lead vocals (2, 9); keyboards (3); bass (4, 11); backing vocals (5); harmonica (9); mixing, producer (all tracks)
 Lovefoxxx – lead vocals (all tracks); backing vocals (4, 6); artwork, photography
 Carolina Parra – guitar (1–4, 6–9, 11); drums (5, 10), keyboards (3); mixing (all tracks)
 Ana Rezende – guitar (2–5, 7–9, 11)
 Clara Ribeiro – backing vocals (1, 3, 5, 7, 8, 10, 11)
 Luiza Sá – guitar (1, 3, 6–8, 10)
 Iracema Trevisan – bass (1–3, 5–10)
 Maria Helena Zerba – keyboards (1, 5)

Additional personnel
 João Marcello Bôscoli – executive producer
 Emanuela Carvalho – image direction
 Ricardo Garcia – mastering
 Tony Kiewel – A&R (international)
 Clayton Martin – drum engineer
 Carlos Eduardo Miranda – A&R (Brazil)
 Sabrina Roistacher – image coordinator
 Rodrigo Sanches – mixing
 Eduarda de Souza – photography
 André Szajman – executive producer
 Cláudio Szajman – executive producer
 Tatiana Zanini – image coordinator

Charts

Certifications

Release history

References

2005 debut albums
CSS (band) albums
Sire Records albums
Sub Pop albums